Interstate 77 (I-77) in the US state of West Virginia is a major north–south Interstate Highway.

The highway serves Charleston, the capital and largest city in West Virginia; it also serves the cities of Princeton, Beckley, and Parkersburg. I-77 follows the entire length of the West Virginia Turnpike, a toll road that runs between Princeton and Charleston, and it runs concurrently with I-64 between Beckley and Charleston.

Historically, the West Virginia Turnpike was a two-lane road with treacherous curves and a tunnel (which has since been decommissioned). Construction began in 1952, several years before the Interstate Highway System was funded. It was only in 1987 that the entire length of the turnpike was upgraded to Interstate standards. Due to the difficulty and lives lost in construction, it has been called "88 miles of miracle".

Route description

Virginia to Charleston

I-77 enters West Virginia from Virginia via the East River Mountain Tunnel, running concurrently with US Route 52 (US 52). It surfaces in Mercer County to the east of Bluefield as a four-lane freeway. I-77 then turns to the northeast and comes to a partial interchange with West Virginia Route 112 (WV 112) in Ingleside. Changing its course to a more northerly alignment, I-77 reaches another partial interchange serving County Route 27 (CR 27). It then continues north toward Princeton, which is served by an interchange with US 460. Here, I-77 becomes the West Virginia Turnpike, which it remains through Charleston. The highway continues northward through rural Mercer County, roughly following US 19. After passing over WV 20 with no access, the space between the northbound and southbound roadways widens. The two roadways reunite at a point north of an interchange for CR 7 and WV 20 near Gardner. Continuing north, the highway approaches the turnpike's Bluestone Service Plaza, accessible from the northbound lanes only. I-77 then crosses the Bluestone River in Eads Mill, and the southbound roadway has a rest area and weigh station. Now heading northwesterly, the highway approaches an interchange with US 19 and passes Camp Creek State Park in Camp Creek, where the road turns north again.

Running closely parallel with US 19, I-77 enters Raleigh County near the community of Ghent. Here, the road has an interchange with CR 48, providing access to Winterplace Ski Resort. I-77's northbound and southbound lanes separate here, and the highway approaches its first toll plaza. The two roadways reunite at a point south of Daniels. I-77 meets I-64 south of Beckley, and the two highways become concurrent. The highways bypass the west side of Beckley, meeting WV 16 and WV 3 and passing the turnpike's Beckley Service Area, which includes Tamarack Marketplace at exit 45. Near the community of Prosperity, the highway has an exit for US 19 with a toll on the northbound exit and southbound entrance. I-77 heads north from Beckley into the Appalachian Mountains. It enters Fayette County near Pax, where it has an exit serving CR . After this exit is the second toll plaza on the turnpike. Continuing in a northwest direction, I-77 comes to an interchange with WV 612 near Mossy. Immediately after the northbound exit, the median narrows and changes to a Jersey barrier. This section of the road until Chelyan has a large number of curves, and it passes the Morton Service Area.

The turnpike crosses into Kanawha County near Standard shortly afterward. Curving to the west and to the north again, I-77 has an exit serving Sharon. The highway continues north until it reaches the northernmost toll plaza on the turnpike and the Kanawha River near Cabin Creek, where it turns northwest to follow the river toward Charleston. Soon afterward is an exit for the Admiral T. J. Lopez Bridge, providing access to US 60 on the north side of the river. Parallel with WV 61, after passing Chesapeake and Marmet, I-77 crosses the river between exits 95 (WV 61) and 96 (US 60) in Port Amherst. The West Virginia Turnpike ends after exit 96.

Charleston to Ohio

I-77/I-64 continues west along the north side of the Kanawha River closely parallel with US 60 after the turnpike ends. In eastern Charleston, the highway passes to the north of the historic Craik-Patton House. Continuing northwest, the road comes to interchanges serving the 35th Street Bridge and WV 114, the latter of which provides access to the West Virginia State Capitol. The route then enters downtown Charleston and crosses the Elk River before separating from I-64 at an interchange in north Charleston. I-77 heads northeasterly along the river until it meets the southern terminus of I-79 near Yeager Airport. I-77 then heads north into rural Kanawha County. After passing interchanges with CR 27, CR 29, WV 622, and CR 21 in Sissonville, the freeway enters Jackson County near Goldtown.

I-77 serves the communities of Kenna via an interchange with WV 34 and Fairplain via CR 21. The highway continues northward through Ripley, where it intersects US 33 and WV 62. It runs concurrently with US 33 and does so through Silverton, where US 33 leaves the Interstate and WV 2 joins it. I-77/WV 2 turns northeasterly toward Rockport, where it enters Wood County and turns northward toward Parkersburg. The highway runs through the southeast corner of Parkersburg, bypassing the center of the city. After an interchange with WV 14 near Mineral Wells, I-77/WV 2 crosses the Little Kanawha River south of Parkersburg, intersects WV 47 and US 50, and heads northeastward from the city. WV 2 leaves I-77 soon after, at exit 179 for WV 68 in North Hills. I-77 heads northward toward Williamstown, which is served by an exit for WV 14. I-77 then crosses the Ohio River into Marietta, Ohio, on the Marietta–Williamstown Interstate Bridge.

History

Early years

In the antebellum years before West Virginia separated from Virginia, development of adequate roads was a major area of conflict between the western regions and the east. Through the Virginia Board of Public Works, the Virginia state government helped finance turnpikes among its programs to encourage internal improvements, with tolls collected to defray operating costs and retire debt. Principal among these was the east–west Staunton and Parkersburg Turnpike, completed from Staunton to the Ohio River at Parkersburg immediately prior to the American Civil War (1861–1865). However, many of the internal transportation improvements were destroyed during that conflict, although bonded debt remained to be paid, even as additional progress had ended. After resolution by the US Supreme Court, which assigned a third of the amount due to the new state early in the 20th century, West Virginia was faced with retiring its share of Virginia's antebellum debt for the earlier turnpikes (and canals and railroads) even as the citizens needed and sought better roads.

With the completion of the earliest portion of the Pennsylvania Turnpike before World War II, the desire for such a superhighway in West Virginia took hold. By the midcentury, in the years before creation of the Interstate Highway System in 1956, superhighways in the form of additional toll roads, such as the New Jersey Turnpike and the Ohio Turnpike, began stimulating economic development and enhancing transportation in the eastern US.

The challenge of terrain in West Virginia mirrored that of Pennsylvania in some ways but with several important distinctions. The most important of these was that the first portion of the Pennsylvania Turnpike had largely followed and utilized a costly earlier rail project which had never been completed. On the West Virginia Turnpike, there would be no such advantage.

Planning and early construction

Originally serviced by railroads and then two-lane highways, by the mid-20th century, the cities of southern and central West Virginia grew to the point where the roadways between these regions were becoming woefully inadequate. Heavier traffic loads and increasing traffic volumes made the existing roads dangerous with safety statistics to prove it. In 1949, Governor Okey Patteson oversaw the creation of the Turnpike Commission which was the start of the planning of what was to become the West Virginia Turnpike.

Two years earlier, the state legislature had appropriated funds to study the feasibility of building a superhighway comparable to similar projects being planned and constructed in other states. Early proposals showed a highway stretching from Parkersburg to Princeton, while another map diagrammed a route from Wheeling to Princeton. Both of these plans, however, were shelved in a 1951 study, citing the extreme costs of building a modern highway through very unforgiving terrain as the primary reason. The study recommended that the northern terminus be moved to Fairplain just outside Ripley and that the southern terminus remain in Princeton. The study also suggested that the highway be constructed as a two-lane facility rather than a four-lane highway, with provisions for future widening when funding became available.

In November 1951, the final alignment was chosen. The route was  shorter than the original road mileage between Charleston and Princeton but would save motorists over two hours of driving between those two points. Original cost projections came in at $78 million (equivalent to $ in ). According to the West Virginia Turnpike CAF Report:

The Commission issued $96 million [equivalent to $ in ] of % revenue bonds in April 1952, and groundbreaking took place in August of that year. Due to the occurrence of large slides midway through construction that had to be corrected at additional expense, revenue bonds for an additional $37 million [equivalent to $ in ] were sold at %. The year 1953 kicked off a period of intense earthmoving that at its peak reached  a week and totaled .

When ground was broken on the first segment of the turnpike in 1952, the northern terminus had once again been moved south. This time, it was placed at Charleston, citing cost as the primary reason. The cost was projected to be $133 million (equivalent to $ in ) and to be funded through bonds that would be repaid through a system of tolls. This cost included $5 million (equivalent to $ in ) for a two-lane tunnel to connect Dawes to Standard.

Construction took two years at the cost of five workers. The first section of the highway, the southern  from Beckley to Princeton, opened to traffic on September 2, 1954. In November, the remaining  between Charleston and Beckley opened. The new turnpike had several nicknames, including " of miracle" and "the engineering marvel that beat the mountains". Triangular turnpike shields, with the words "West Virginia" at the top and an interlocking "T" and "P" in the center, were installed along the highway. Six interchanges were constructed. Initially, the road used a ticket-based tolling system. At each interchange, bridges and underpasses for the mainline had an extra set of graded lanes, indicating that the turnpike was expected to be widened in the future. According to the West Virginia Turnpike CAF Report:

The $1.5 million per mile [/km; equivalent to $ per mile (/km) in )] was only one of the staggering statistics used by journalists as far away as Michigan and New York to describe their "amazement at an engineering achievement of such heroic proportions".

Three service areas, each served by an at-grade intersection, were constructed at Morton, Bluestone, and Beckley. The service areas were originally referred to as "Glass Houses".

For the first few years, the West Virginia Turnpike was a desolate roadway. Although the northern terminus was at a large city, it connected to no other major highways or free-flowing roads. The highway lost some of its "marvel" when The Saturday Evening Post referred to the road as "the turnpike that goes to nowhere".

Soon after the turnpike was completed, the Interstate Highway System began. The new turnpike, despite its lack of compliance with Interstate Highway standards, cut travel time considerably through the state of West Virginia and linked the southern states to the northern states. This new link, however, was overloaded with traffic by the late 1960s. The turnpike became known as a death-trap, mainly because in-state drivers who were accustomed to lower traffic volumes could not handle the increased traffic that came with the new connection and increased auto and truck accidents resulting in fatalities. By 1975, the death toll for the 21-year-old highway was at 278, and, in 1979, 28 fatalities occurred on the turnpike.

Popular T-shirts proclaimed, "I survived the West Virginia Turnpike."

Modernization

In the 1960s and 1970s, the growing Interstate Highway System brought in toll-free segments of newly built I-77 from Ohio to the north, and Virginia to the south ends of the turnpike. I-64 was completed from the Kentucky border east to Charleston. Work on I-79 extended south from Pennsylvania through Morgantown and Clarksburg to Charleston. Another portion of I-64 was built from Virginia west into the southern portion of the state, ending abruptly at Sam Black Church.

These connections brought more traffic to West Virginia than the two-lane turnpike could handle adequately. Congestion at the toll plazas was a major concern, along with the increased fatality rate.

The gap on I-64 between Sam Black Church and Charleston forced east–west traffic to use a scenic but treacherous section of US 60 known as the Midland Trail through Rainelle and Ansted before the road descended Gauley Mountain at Hawk's Nest to the Kanawha River Valley to reach Charleston. There were terrible accidents along this stretch and lengthy delays as trucks negotiated the major grades.

Expansion
Studies were undertaken to upgrade the highway in the early 1970s. In 1974, the cost to expand the turnpike to four lanes was placed at $350 million (equivalent to $ in ). When the project had not started by 1975, articles in local newspapers attacked the state workers for their "laziness" in pursuing the upgrade of the highway. Turnpike officials worried, as the costs for upgrading the toll road were increasing dramatically. In 1976, contracts totaling well over $200 million (equivalent to $ in ) were awarded, and construction began. The first section to be modernized was the section from milepost 10.6 (just north of exit 9, US 460) in Mercer County to milepost 35.52 (south of exit 40, I-64) in Raleigh County, completed in 1979. The following year, a segment from milepost 46.7 to milepost 47.95 (exit 48, to US 19) was completed just north of Beckley.

In 1981, Fayette County completed a brief segment from milepost 56.15 near Long Branch to milepost 59.63 (exit 60, Mossy) and from milepost 62.27 near Kingston to milepost 66.51 (exit 66, Mahan). In 1982, the modernization of the turnpike from milepost 52.2 just south of Willis Branch to milepost 6.12 near Lively was completed. A second Kanawha River Bridge near Malden and the Kanawha City neighborhood of Charleston was built to carry an additional two lanes of traffic between mileposts 94.96–95.87. This four-lane upgrade was extended southward to milepost 90 (exit 89, WV 94, Marmet) in 1984.

A segment between Fayette and Kanawha counties was dualized from milepost 66.51 (exit 66, Mahan) to milepost 74.96 (exit 74, Standard) in 1983. Traffic just to the west of this interchange used the two-lane Bender Bridge and Memorial Tunnel. In 1984, the turnpike was dualized from milepost 90 (exit 89, WV 94, Marmet) to milepost 82.55; this included construction of a new Toll Plaza C near Sharon. In 1985, work continued on a segment south of Mossy from milepost 59.63 (exit 60, Mossy) to milepost 62.27 near Kingston. Also, a segment from the southern terminus of the turnpike at milepost 8.97 (exit 9, US 460) to milepost 10.6 in Mercer County was reconstructed. In the same year, the Raleigh County segment from milepost 40.73 (exit 40, I-64) to milepost 43.83 (exit 44, WV 3) was dualized, and the segment from milepost 47.95 (exit 48, to US 19) to milepost 52.2 (Toll Plaza B at Pax) was completed. In 1986, the segment from milepost 35.52 to milepost 40.73 (exit 40, I-64) was dualized. In 1987, work was finished on the dualization from milepost 43.83 (exit 44, WV 3) to milepost 46.6. The last segment was completed when the Memorial Tunnel and Bender Bridge were bypassed with a massive road cut.

Bypassing Memorial Tunnel
The only remaining segment, the Memorial Tunnel, once hailed as "state-of-the-art" and the "most majestic feature of the highway", was becoming a bottleneck in the otherwise four-lane highway. By 1986, the Turnpike Commission was spending over $500,000 per year (equivalent to $ per year in ) to maintain the lights and the automatic exhaust equipment in the tunnel.

Several options were considered, including dualization of the tunnels, addition of two lanes through a large road cut in the mountain, leaving the other two lanes in the tunnel, and replacement of the entire tunnel with an open cut to the north. Citing the high maintenance costs of a tunnel, the replacement option was ultimately chosen.

"The biggest relief will be from our utility crews, who had to maintain the electrical systems and so forth in the tunnel", Turnpike Commission Chair George McIntryre said. "It will make all of our jobs easier as far as traffic is concerned on the turnpike."

The  bypass would bypass both the tunnel and the Bender Bridge which crossed Paint Creek just to the east of the tunnel portal. On July 6, 1987, the Memorial Tunnel officially closed, and two lanes of the open cut just to the north of it were opened. The other two lanes of the open cut were completed in late August.

State Trooper W. D. Thomson became the last motorist to drive through the tunnel. It was not meant to be that way. Originally, Tommy Graley of Standard and his two daughters were picked to be in the last vehicle to pass through the tunnel, but his pickup truck was followed by a car carrying Turnpike officials and the state trooper.

The new Memorial Tunnel bypass cost $35 million (equivalent to $ in ) and required years of work.  of earth were removed and used as fill with drainage tiles for Paint Creek. Some  of coal were extracted. The Bender Bridge was demolished. The former Memorial Tunnel was used for storage until the mid-1990s, when it became a testing center for tunnel-fire suppression for Boston's Big Dig project.

The tunnel is still being used today by the National Response Center for military and other testing uses. The bypass was not the first of its kind on a toll road, as the Pennsylvania Turnpike bypassed the Laurel Hill Tunnel in 1964 in similar fashion, and later bypassed two more tunnels with a single stretch of highway in 1968.

Later history

The final cost for the entire modernization of the West Virginia Turnpike was $683 million (equivalent to $ in ), more than $300 million (equivalent to $ in ) over original estimates. It was also one of the few Interstates that received 90-percent federal funding and permission to charge a toll, due to extremely high construction costs. A total of 18 interchanges now exist on the West Virginia Turnpike, up from the original six. A rest area is now provided at milepost 69 for southbound motorists, and a scenic overlook of the Bluestone River also serves southbound motorists.

The turnpike displays many cuts through mountains as well as lanes that are separated from each other by substantial difference in elevation. With the completion of I-77, I-79, and finally I-64 by 1988, the turnpike has again become stressed, especially during peak holiday seasons.

On June 1, 1989, the West Virginia Legislature created the West Virginia Parkways, Economic Development and Tourism Authority to replace the Turnpike Commission.

In 1991, the Morton and Bluestone Glass Houses were replaced with larger, more modern travel centers. In 1993, the Beckley Glass House was also replaced. Morton and Bluestone service plazas were available to northbound travelers only, while the Beckley service plaza was accessible only to southbound motorists. HMSHost operates the various restaurants at the plazas, while ExxonMobil (through its Exxon brand) operates the gas station at each plaza.

In May 1996, exit 45 was renovated to serve the Beckley travel plaza, Dry Hill Road, and the newly constructed Tamarack Marketplace arts and crafts outlet. This made the Beckley plaza and Tamarack Marketplace accessible to northbound travelers.

In 2004, a concession stand and new restroom facilities were constructed at the rest area at milepost 69, serving southbound travelers. The milepost 69 rest area and snack bar was razed and replaced with a larger facility in 2017. In 2021, the Parkways Authority sought public input for modernization of the travel plazas, representing the first significant work on the travel plazas since they were built in the early 1990s.

Bond troubles
At one point in the turnpike's history, the Turnpike Commission was not able to pay off even the interest on its bonded indebtedness, and the first bond was not retired until 1982. When the original bond expired on December 1, 1989, the Turnpike Commission had difficulty determining how to refinance it.

Total revenues from 1954 through 1986 totaled $309.3 million (equivalent to $ in ), with interest of $170.7 million (equivalent to $ in ). In 1986, total annual revenues were $30.4 million (equivalent to $ in ). The commission predicted that when I-64 was completed from Beckley to Sam Black Church in 1988, 6,500 more vehicles would travel the turnpike daily. In the previous 10 years, the commission noted, traffic increased 100 percent and annual gross revenues increased from $11.4 million to $30.4 million (equivalent to $ to $ in ). The refinancing plan was ultimately completed about six months later, with a new debt approaching $50 million (equivalent to $ in ). Consequently, tolls were held at former rates, ranging from $3.75 to $12 (equivalent to $ to $ in ) per one-way through trip.

Tolls

There are three toll barriers along the turnpike. , passenger cars with two axles pay $4.25 at each barrier. There is also a toll plaza at exit 48, which charges $0.75 for passenger cars exiting northbound and entering southbound. Rates for larger vehicles are higher. The West Virginia Turnpike is a member of the E-ZPass electronic toll collection consortium, allowing members to attach a transponder to their windshield or front bumper and pay electronically. West Virginia E-ZPass members can pay a flat annual fee for unlimited travel on the West Virginia Turnpike.

The Parkways Authority briefly raised toll rates on January 1, 2006, but a state judge found the hike to be illegal, rescinding it a few days later. The state legislature subsequently affirmed the judge's decision and removed the Commission's power to set rates, reserving that power to itself. Greg Barr, General Manager of the West Virginia Parkways Authority, had said that, while other states had dramatically increased their tolls over the past few years, the West Virginia Turnpike had not experienced any rate hikes in over two decades. However, tolls were subsequently increased by 60 percent (from $1.25 to $2 at each barrier) in 2009 and again by 100 percent (to $4.00 at each barrier) in 2019.

In 2013, the West Virginia House of Delegates voted in support of a resolution to remove tolls on the turnpike by 2020, but the West Virginia Parkways Authority resolved in 2016 to continue charging tolls after that date.

Tamarack Marketplace

Tamarack Marketplace, located at the Beckley service area, is an arts and crafts outlet that draws over 500,000 visitors a year. Tamarack features juried West Virginia craft products, including handcrafts, pottery, jewelry, fine arts, and products made from textiles, glass, metal, and wood. There are live artisan demonstrations as well as live music, a theater, and storytelling performances. It also contains a cafeteria-style restaurant.

Exit list

See also

References

External links

 West Virginia
77
Transportation in Wood County, West Virginia
Transportation in Jackson County, West Virginia
Transportation in Kanawha County, West Virginia
Transportation in Fayette County, West Virginia
Transportation in Raleigh County, West Virginia
Transportation in Mercer County, West Virginia